The XVI Grand Prix du Comminges was a Formula Two motor race held on 10 August 1952 in Saint-Gaudens, Haute-Garonne, France. It was round 7 of Les Grands Prix de France Championship. Race distance was determined by time rather than the number of laps, the result being declared after 3 hours. The win was shared by André Simon and Alberto Ascari in a Ferrari 500; Ascari taking over Simon's car after his own suffered mechanical failure. Ascari had started from pole, and also set fastest lap. Their teammate Giuseppe Farina finished second and Jean Behra in a Simca Gordini Type 15 was third.

Classification

Race

References

Comminges Grand Prix
Comminges Grand Prix
Comminges Grand Prix